The Guru is a 2002 sex comedy film written by Tracey Jackson and directed by Daisy von Scherler Mayer. The film centers on a dance teacher who comes to the United States from India to pursue a normal career but incidentally stumbles into a brief but high-profile career as a sex guru, a career based on a philosophy he learns from a pornographic actress.

The film stars Jimi Mistry as the eponymous character, Heather Graham as the actress he learns from, and Marisa Tomei, who helps him reach his guru status among her socialite New York City friends.  The film was a commercial success, grossing $24 million in worldwide box office against its budget of $11 million.

Plot
Ramu Gupta (Jimi Mistry), a dance teacher, leaves his native city Delhi, India, to seek his fortune in the United States. He is lured by the exaggerations of his cousin, Vijay, who has already moved to NYC.

Seeking work as an actor, the naïve Ramu unknowingly lands a role in a pornographic film. That evening he accompanies Vijay and his roommates on a catering job at a society birthday party. When the Indian swami hired to address the party falls into drunken oblivion, Ramu takes his place. Lacking a real philosophy, he improvises by repeating advice he had been given by Sharonna (Heather Graham), an adult film actress he met earlier. Lexi (Marisa Tomei), the birthday girl, is so impressed that she promotes him as a New Age sex guru to her friends.

Ramu hires Sharonna, ostensibly for advice on how to be an actor in adult films, though what he really wants is more ideas he could use in his new role as the guru of sex. A personal relationship develops between them, though Sharonna is engaged to a firefighter who thinks she's a substitute school teacher.

Ramu becomes an overnight celebrity, widely known as a spiritual leader - the Guru of Sex. The fame comes at a price, however, and he must choose between his newfound fame and his feelings for Sharonna.

Ramu has a national television appearance where he admits to being a fraud, but passes the torch to Lexi, then hurries across town to stop Sharonna's wedding. At the door to the church Ramu coincides with her fiancé's secret gay lover Randy (Bobby Cannavale). They both object to the wedding, being in love with the bride and groom. The film ends with a Bollywood dance number.

Cast
 Jimi Mistry as Ramu Gupta
 Heather Graham as Sharonna
 Marisa Tomei as Alexandra "Lexi" Hamilton
 Dash Mihok as Rusty McGee, Sharonna's fiancé
 Michael McKean as Dwain, a director of adult films
 Christine Baranski as Chantal Hamilton, Lexi's mother
 Ronald Guttman as Edwin Hamilton, Lexi's father
 Thomas McCarthy as Lars Hamilton, Lexi's brother
 Emil Marwa as Vijay Rao, Ramu's cousin
 Ajay Naidu as Sanjiv, Vijay's roommate
 Charles Singh as Amit, Vijay's roommate
 Bobby Cannavale as Randy, Rusty's gay lover
 Malachy McCourt as Father Flannigan
 Sanjeev Bhaskar as Chef
 Anita Gillette as Mrs. McGee, Rusty's mother
 Pat McNamara as Mr. McGee, Rusty's father
 Sinia Jane as Mrs. Gupta, Rumu's mother
 Anoop Puri as Mr. Gupta, Rumu's father
 Rizwan Manji as Party Waiter
 Damian Young as Hank, the camera man
 Dwight Ewell as Peaches, Sharonna's friend
 Alex Khan as Young Ramu Gupta
 Sakina Jaffery as a young woman in Dance class

Production
The Guru was filmed in 2001, mostly on location in New York City, though a few scenes were filmed in Delhi.

Locations in New York City included Times Square, Manhattan's Chinatown, Central Park, Hunts Point, Queens, Brooklyn, the George Washington Bridge, and close to the World Trade Center (the shot was not removed after the September 11 attacks). Ramu's Broadway debut was filmed at Reverend Ike's United Palace Theater, while the setting for the finale was Bethlehem Lutheran Church in Bay Ridge, Brooklyn.

Music
The film features several Bollywood-style song-and-dance numbers, including one where Ramu and Sharonna  sing a version of Kya Mil Gaya from Sasural that morphs into a version of "You're the One That I Want" from Grease. The song "Every Kinda People" by Jo O'Meara of S Club 7 fame is used in the film's end credits, and also included is "One Way Or Another" by Sophie Ellis-Bextor, "Don't Say Goodbye" from Paulina Rubio's Border Girl album. "Round Round" by Sugababes also features.

Release
The Guru opened in wide release in United Kingdom, and it eventually grossed $10 million - a solid box office success in United Kingdom. In the United States, the film grossed a respectful $3 million in limited theatrical release. Overall, the film grossed $24 million in worldwide box office against its budget of $11 million.

Critical reception
On the movie review aggregator site Rotten Tomatoes, The Guru has a 57% rating, with 50 of 88 reviewers giving the film a "fresh" rating. The site's consensus reads, "A sweetly silly but wafer-thin romantic comedy."  Based on 30 reviews, the film's Metacritic score is 47 ("mixed").

After viewing it at the Edinburgh International Film Festival, Derek Elley, reviewing it for Variety, called it a "generally entertaining but rather old-fashioned sex comedy" whose "basic plot of a naive Indian stumbling through white U.S. society...shows little advance in attitudes and humor on Blake Edwards' 1968 comedy The Party."  A BBC review said it "stirs together Bollywood and Hollywood, satire and romance, to create an appealing masala dish of a movie."

After its U.S. premiere, Stephen Holden of The New York Times called it a "nervy conceptual hybrid" that "lurch[es] between a loudmouthed sitcom and a crude social satire" and noted that "behind its Hollywood-meets-Bollywood banner, The Guru... is a grindingly conventional comedy that insists on tying up its subplots in pretty ribbons and bows."

References

External links
 
 
 
 

2002 films
2002 romantic comedy films
American romantic comedy films
American sex comedy films
British Indian films
British romantic comedy films
British sex comedy films
2000s English-language films
English-language French films
Films about pornography
Films directed by Daisy von Scherler Mayer
Films produced by Eric Fellner
Films produced by Tim Bevan
French films set in New York City
Films shot in New York City
French romantic comedy films
French sex comedy films
Films about Indian Americans
StudioCanal films
Universal Pictures films
Working Title Films films
British films set in New York City
2000s American films
2000s British films
2000s French films